The Homosexualization of America, The Americanization of the Homosexual is a 1982 book about LGBT rights in the United States by the gay rights activist Dennis Altman, in which the author discusses the emergence of gay people as a minority group. The book received positive reviews, crediting Altman with providing a useful discussion of gay people in the United States.

Summary
Altman discusses the increased visibility of gay people in the United States and conflicts over gay rights issues there, basing his account partly on his visits to the country. His two major themes are, "the emergence of homosexuals as a new minority with our own culture, life style, political movement, and claim to legitimacy, and the impact of this minority on the broader society." He argues that gay people have come to see themselves as being similar to an ethnic group and to "claim recognition on the basis of this analogy", and that the United States is being "homosexualized", a process that involves, "the adoption of styles and fashions associated with an increasingly visible and assertive gay minority" and is "changing American society in important ways", such as the gentrification of some urban areas. He identifies Karl Marx and Sigmund Freud as influences, arguing that while is not necessary to adopt all of their views, Marx's ideas are essential to discussing social change and that Freud's ideas are essential to discussing human sexuality.

He writes that by the beginning of the 1980s, some gay men had abandoned the "effeminate style" that had previously characterized gay men and adopted a style involving "a theatrically masculine appearance: denim, leather, and the ubiquitous key rings dangling from the belt." He sees this style as typified by the "super-macho image" of the Village People. He addresses the way homosexuality has been dealt with by newspapers and the film industry. He writes that the American film industry has "had the most difficulty coming to terms with homosexuality" of all media in the United States, and that it usually depicts gay people as either villains or victims. He discusses films, such as Windows (1980), Cruising (1980), Fame (1980), Making Love (1982), Personal Best (1982), and Partners (1982), with gay themes. He discusses books dealing with homosexuality such as the psychologist Alan P. Bell and the sociologist Martin S. Weinberg's Homosexualities (1978) and Bell et al.′s Sexual Preference (1981), offering criticisms of both works. He also includes a chapter-length discussion of, "Sexual Freedom and the End of Romance".

Publication history
The Homosexualization of America, The Americanization of the Homosexual was first published by St. Martin's Press in 1982. It was published in a paperback edition by Beacon Press in 1983 as The Homosexualization of America.

Reception

Mainstream media
The Homosexualization of America received positive reviews from David L. Keyes in Library Journal and from Kirkus Reviews.

Keyes credited Altman with providing "an excellent synthesis of a wide variety of gay/lesbian issues in a satisfying blend of research and personal experience", and with showing that gay people in the United States have adapted the political process to their advantage by focusing on lobbying for civil rights, and that American society has undergone a change in its sexual behavior and values.

Kirkus Reviews wrote that the book was a "discerning account of the coming of age of the gay community (with lesser attention to lesbian women)". It expressed doubt about Altman's view that gay people are "pioneers in human relationships", but considered his bibliography "invaluable for the writings of the last decade" and credited him with covering "difficult ground with intelligence and care."

Gay media
The Homosexualization of America received a positive review from the gay rights activist Ken Popert in The Body Politic. The book was also reviewed by the critic Felice Picano in the New York Native and by The Advocate.

Popert considered the book a sophisticated discussion of gay rights. He credited Altman with providing a clear and straightforward account of the meaning of homosexuality, and analyzing "the way in which the conditions which allow the gay movement to advance also impose limitations on it." Though he noted that Altman's views on this topic were not original, he believed that Altman had performed a useful task by "assembling them in a coherent and popular form" for a "large audience for whom they will be novel, challenging and even unsettling." He praised Altman's chapter on "Sexual Freedom and the End of Romance", calling it the most engaging part of the book, and described the book as a whole as, "very much the product of a mature community, sure of itself, capable of self-criticism, confident of its place in history, and infused with an appropriate sense of mystery and destiny." However, he expressed some minor reservations about Altman's work. He called its title "quirky" and suggested that it might have been chosen to appeal to the "ethnocentric" American market, and also found that Altman sometimes diverted attention from his arguments through excessive citations or digressions.

Academic journals
The Homosexualization of America was discussed by Rhonda R. Rivera in University of Pennsylvania Law Review. Rivera credited Altman with discussing the "creation of a homosexual minority" with reference to economic and social factors.

Other evaluations
The social theorist Jonathan Dollimore argued that The Homosexualization of America suggested that "because the prevailing order in some sense requires the denigration of homosexuality" it is not possible for "gay culture to be integrated into the dominant culture" or be accepted by it. Though questioning the historical accuracy of some of Altman's claims, he also credited him with correctly implying that "the negation of desire and the negation of difference are in practice often inseparable". The gay rights activist Will Roscoe argued that Altman was mistaken to maintain that the "minority model of Gay identity and community" is a "new form of social control." He dismissed Altman's advocacy of "universal androgyny and bisexuality" as a "political dead-end."

Altman wrote that The Homosexualization of America represented "the high point of my obsession with the gay world of the United States". He recalled that it "barely reached shops in Australia." Altman also recalled that it resulted from his "infatuation with New York and the new gay culture that seemed to be sweeping aside all other ways of being homosexual" and that an editor dismissed his proposal for the book because he "used the Village People as an emblem of how gay styles were changing." He summarized his argument in The Homosexualization of America as being that, "normality itself was being remade by the new gay affirmation, which in turn reflected the larger shifts being brought about by new social and economic forces that were shaking up old assumptions around sexuality and gender, most evident in the dramatic opening up of career possibilities for women." The political commentator Andrew Sullivan described The Homosexualization of America as, "A pre-AIDS defense of the religious right's nightmare: a culture in which monogamy is not expected in relationships." However, he added that Altman, "describes gay male culture before same-sex marriage became an imaginable option."

Daniel C. Mattson wrote that Altman took an "essentialist" view of homosexuality, something Mattson found a logical consequence of the gay rights movement's objective of "convincing society that homosexuality is as inherent and essential an aspect of man's nature as his skin color and ethnicity."

References

Bibliography
Books

 
 
 
 
 
 
 

Journals

  
  
  
 
  

Online articles

 

1980s LGBT literature
1982 non-fiction books
American non-fiction books
English-language books
Gay non-fiction books
LGBT literature in the United States
Non-fiction books about same-sex sexuality
Sociology books
St. Martin's Press books